Southeast Emmy Awards are a division of the National Academy of Television Arts and Sciences. The Atlanta, Georgia division was founded in 1975. In addition to granting the Southeast Emmy Awards, this division awards scholarships, honors industry veterans at the Gold and Silver Circle Celebration, conducts National Student Production Awards of Excellence, has a free research capability and a nationwide job bank. The chapter also participates in judging Emmy entries at the regional and national levels.

Boundaries
The academy is divided into the following boundaries and encompasses the states of Georgia, Alabama, Mississippi, South Carolina and Asheville, North Carolina. These territories are responsible for the submission of television broadcast materials for awards consideration.

Board of Governors 
The National Academy of Television Arts & Sciences Southeast Chapter Board of Governors is a working board that cooperates and innovates to promote and ensure the best interests of the membership.

Executive Committee Members 

The following Trustees represent the chapter at the national level:
Evelyn Mims
Jeremy Campbell
Karyn Greer - Alternate Trustee

2010 award winners
The 2010 Southeast Emmy Awards were held on June 26, 2010, and broadcast live from Atlanta, Georgia. The event was held at the Grand Hyatt Buckhead and was hosted by television star Mike Pniewski.

2011 award winners
The 2011 Southeast Emmy Awards were held on June 18, 2011, and broadcast live from Atlanta, Georgia. The event was held at the Grand Hyatt Buckhead and was hosted by Broadway producer Kenny Leon.

References

Regional Emmy Awards
Awards established in 1975
1975 establishments in Georgia (U.S. state)